John Wood (died 24 December 1623) was an English politician, elected MP for Bossiney in the parliaments of 1614 and 1621.

He served as a JP in Cornwall from 1617 until his death.

References

1623 deaths
English MPs 1614
English MPs 1621–1622
English justices of the peace